The 2003 Austrian Figure Skating Championships took place between 13 and 15 December 2002 in Dornbirn. Skaters competed in the disciplines of men's singles, ladies' singles, and ice dancing. The results were used to choose the Austrian teams to the 2003 World Championships and the 2003 European Championships.

Senior results

Men

Ladies

Ice dancing

External links
 results

Austrian Figure Skating Championships
2002 in figure skating
Austrian Figure Skating Championships, 2003
Figure skating